The Wiesbaden Region was one of three administrative regions (along with  Darmstadt Region and Kassel Region) from which the state of Hesse was formed in 1945.

Regierungsbezirk (government region)
Following the Prussian annexations after the Austro-Prussian War of 1866, the administrative region of Wiesbaden was founded on February 22, 1867, comprising the formerly independent Duchy of Nassau, the Landgraviate of Hesse-Homburg and the formerly Free City of Frankfurt, previously states of the German Confederation. The Wiesbaden Region was one of the two political subdivisions (along with Kassel Region) within the province of Hesse-Nassau (the Prussian province formed in 1868 including, besides the Wiesbaden Region, further the former Electorate of Hesse, previously another member of the German Confederation).

In 1945 the northwestern part of region was dissected, when the Wiesbaden Region was divided between the American and the French zone of occupation in Germany. The bulk of region with the city of Wiesbaden continued to exist as a region within the new state of Hesse. The dissected northwest formed a new region, the Montabaur Region within Rhineland-Palatinate.

In 1968, the region was dissolved, and its territory was merged in the Darmstadt Region.

Region presidents (Regierungspräsidenten) 
 1867–1869 Gustav von Diest
 1869–1872 Botho Graf zu Eulenberg
 1872–1890 Lothar von Wurmb
 1890–1897 Viktor von Tepper-Laski
 1898–1902 Richard Wentzel
 1902–1905 Wilhelm Hengstenberg
 1905–1919 Karl Wilhelm von Meister
 1919–1922 Willy Momm
 1923–1925 Konrad Haenisch (SPD)
 1925–1933 Fritz Ehrler (SPD)
 1933–1936 Werner Zschintsch (NSDAP)
 1936–1943 Fritz Pfeffer von Salomon (NSDAP)
 1943–1945 Otto Schwebel (NSDAP)
 1945 (1 May - 3 August) Hans Bredow
 1945–1948 Martin Nischalke (SPD)
 1948–1956 Heinrich Noelle
 1959–1963 Walter Schubert
 1963–1968 Karl Wittrock (SPD)

Bezirksverband (regional association)
Unlike other Prussian regions the Wiesbaden Region was not only an administrative entity of the Prussian government, but its pertaining counties formed a body, the Bezirksverband Nassau or Wiesbaden (about: regional association), with its own representative assembly (Nassauischer Kommunallandtag Wiesbaden, i.e. Nassau Communal Diet, existed between 1866 and 1933) and premises provided and tasks fulfilled for the entirety of the counties within the region. These tasks comprised among others schools, traffic installations, sanitary premises, hospitals, cultural institutions, jails etc. The same was the case in the Kassel Region with an own assembly (Kurhessischer Kommunallanddtag Kassel).

In most other Prussian provinces the tasks and rights of a Bezirksverband were fulfilled by the Provinzialverband (provincial association), comprising as members all the counties in a province instead of a region. The Nassau Communal Diet elected a regional government (first Verwaltungsausschuss, later Landesausschuss, i.e. administrative / land committee) presided over by the Landesdirektor (i.e. land director) or Landeshauptmann (i.e. land captain). On 8 June 1885 the Kommunalständischer Verband Frankfurt (i.e. Communal Estate Association of Frankfurt), holding the same responsibilities in the territory of the former Free City of Frankfurt upon Main, was merged into the regional association of Wiesbaden. The same reform enfranchised the Nassau Communal Diet to elect representatives for the newly established provincial diet of the Province of Hesse-Nassau, first convened in 1886.

In the course of the democratisation of the Prussian administration after 1918 the communal diets were directly elected by the people. After the abolition of the Nassau Communal Diet by the Nazi dictatorship each Landeshauptmann was appointed. After 1945 the administrative committees elected the Landeshauptmann, the regional parliament was not reestablished. In 1953 the Wiesbaden regional association was dissolved and its tasks and assets transferred to the new statewide State Welfare Association of Hesse (Landeswohlfahrtsverband Hessen).

Elections to the communal diets

|-style="background:#E9E9E9;"
!colspan="2" align="left"|Parties
!%1921
!+/-1921
!Seats1921
!+/-1921
!%1925
!+/-1925
!Seats1925
!+/-1925
!%1929
!+/-1929
!Seats1929
!+/-1929
!%1933
!+/-1933
!Seats1933
!+/-1933
|-
|bgcolor="red"|
|align="left"|SPD
|29.9
|
|18
|
|rowspan="1"|30.6 
|rowspan="2"| +0.7 (-4.6) 
|rowspan="2"|16
|rowspan="2"| -2 (-5)
|rowspan="2"|26.2 
|rowspan="2"| -4.4
|rowspan="2"|14
|rowspan="2"| -2
|rowspan="2"|17.8 
|rowspan="2"| -8.4
|rowspan="2"|10
|rowspan="2"| -4
|-
|bgcolor="#ff2222"|
|align="left"|USPD
|5.3
| +5.3
|3
| +3
| mergedin SPD
|-
|bgcolor="#0000CD"|
|align="left"|Zentrum
|20.6
|
|12
| 
|22.5
| +1.9
|12
| -2
|18.9
| -3.6
|10 
| -2
|16.1 
| -2.8
|10
| 0
|-
|bgcolor="blue"|
|align="left"|DVP
|18.2
| +18.2
|11
| +11
|6.3
| -5.9
|3
| -8
|9.7
| +3.4
|5
| +2
|
|
|0
| -5
|-
|bgcolor="#63B8ff"|
|align="left"|DNVP
|10.8
| +10.8
|7
| +7
|rowspan="1"|5.4
|rowspan="1"| -5.4 
|rowspan="1"|3
|rowspan="1"| -4
|5.2 
| -0.2
|3
| 0
|6 
| +0.8
|4
| +1
|-
|bgcolor="yellow"|
|align="left"|DDP
|9.7
| +9.7
|7
| +7
|5.9
| -3.8
|4
| -3
|4.5 
| -1.4
|3
| 0
|1.7
| -2.8
|0
| -3
|-
|bgcolor="#8B0000"|
|align="left"|KPD
|3.4
| +3.4
|2
| +2
|6.4 
| +3
|4 
| +2
| 8.21
| +1.81
| 5
| +1
| 7
| -1.21
| 4
| -1
|-
|bgcolor="turquoise"|
|align="left"|HNASL
|not run
|not run
|not run
|not run
|14.1
| +14.1
|7
| +7
| 
|
|0
| -7
| 
|
|0
| 0
|-
|bgcolor="#CEB673"|
|align="left"|WP
|not run
|not run
|not run
|not run
|7.8 
| +7.8
|3
| +3
|5.1 
| -2.7
|3
| 0
|
|
|0
| -3
|-
|bgcolor="brown"|
|align="left"|NSDAP
|not run
|not run
|not run
|not run
|
| 
|
| 
|8.19 
| 
|4
| +4
|48.6
| +40,41
|27
| +23
|-
|bgcolor="purple"|
|align="left"|CNBL
|not run
|not run
|not run
|not run
|not run
|not run
|not run
|not run
|8.4
| +8.4
|5
| +5
|
|
|0
| -5
|-
|bgcolor="green"|
|align="left"|NaLa
|
|
|1
| +1
|
| 
|0
| -1
|
|
|0
| 0
|
|
|0
| 0
|-style="background:#E9E9E9;"
!colspan="2" align="left"|Total1921
!align="center" colspan="2"|
!align="center" colspan="1"|61
!
!colspan="2" align="left"|Total1925
!align="center" colspan="1"|52
!
!colspan="2" align="left"|Total1929
!align="center" colspan="1"|52
!
!colspan="2" align="left"|Total1933
!align="center" colspan="1"|55
!
|}

Land director and land captains (Landesdirektor / Landeshauptmann) 
1873–1881: Christian Wirth (1826–1895; Liberal Union), titled Landesdirektor
1881–1905: Otto Sartorius (1831–1911), titled Landeshauptmann
1905–1920: August Krekel (1847–1921), titled Landeshauptmann
1920–1926: Wilhelm Woell (1871–1926), titled Landeshauptmann
1926–1933: Wilhelm Lutsch (1879–), titled Landeshauptmann
1933–1944: Wilhelm Traupel (1891–1946; NSDAP), titled Landeshauptmann
1945: Ernst Ludwig Leyser (1896–1973; NSDAP), titled Landeshauptmann
1946–1953: Otto Witte (1884–1963; SPD), titled Landeshauptmann

See also 
 Wiesbaden
 Hesse-Nassau
 Greater Hesse

References 
 Eckhart G. Franz, Die Chronik Hessens, Dortmund: Chronik Verlag, 1991. 
 Karl Müller, Preußischer Adler und Hessischer Löwe – Hundert Jahre Wiesbadener Regierung 1866–1966, Wiesbaden: 1966
 Andreas Anderhub,  Verwaltung im Regierungsbezirk Wiesbaden 1866 - 1885, Historische Kommission für Nassau (ed.), Wiesbaden: 1977

Notes

Regions of Hesse
1866 establishments in Prussia
Government regions of Prussia
States and territories disestablished in 1968
Former government regions of Germany